Jeff Cunningham (born August 21, 1976) is an American former professional soccer player who played as a forward. He is Major League Soccer's third-all-time leader in regular-season goals scored with 134.

Youth and college
Cunningham was born in Jamaica, but moved to Crystal River, Florida at the age of fourteen. He played college soccer at the University of South Florida from 1994 to 1997. As a sophomore and a junior, Cunningham was named first-team All-Conference USA, and as a senior he was named Conference USA Player of the Year. He finished his career at USF with forty-one goals and thirty-six assists.

Career

Professional
Upon graduating, Cunningham was selected ninth overall in the 1998 MLS College Draft by the Columbus Crew. As a rookie, he played in twenty-five games, mostly as a substitute, and tied the rookie record for goals (since broken by Damani Ralph) with eight. Cunningham became a starter in 1999 and held that role for several years. In 182 games for Columbus, he scored sixty-two goals and notched forty-three assists. He was named to the MLS Best XI in 2002, after scoring sixteen goals and adding five assists. After a disappointing 2004 season Cunningham was traded to Colorado Rapids for a first-round 2006 MLS SuperDraft pick. He left the Crew tied with Brian McBride for the all-time team lead in goals.

Cunningham finished the 2005 season with twelve league goals for Colorado. He scored twice against Fulham F.C. of the Premier League in the 2005 MLS All-Star Game. His showing in an all-star game against Real Madrid also earned good reviews, despite MLS's 5–0 loss. However, after the year Colorado shipped him to Real Salt Lake for Clint Mathis. Cunningham was seventh on the all-time MLS goalscoring list entering the 2006 season.

During the 2006 season Cunningham led the league in scoring with sixteen goals, winning the MLS Golden Boot. He also tied for the second-most assists in the league with eleven. Both totals (16 goals and 11 assists) set single-season records for the RSL franchise.

On May 22, 2007, Cunningham was dealt to Toronto FC in exchange for Alecko Eskandarian and a first-round draft pick in the 2008 MLS SuperDraft. In Toronto, he wore the number 96 to represent the 96 MLS goals he had scored after the conclusion of his first season with Toronto FC.

Cunningham fell out of favor in his second season with Toronto FC, missing scoring a goal line ball that would have taken Toronto to the CONCACAF Champions League. After the match, TFC coach John Carver said "I am thinking, ‘How did he score 99 goals?’ That’s what I thought.’"

On August 8, 2008, Cunningham was traded to FC Dallas in exchange for a third-round pick in the 2009 MLS SuperDraft. He scored in his first match with FC Dallas on August 16, 2008 in a 2–1 loss to the Columbus Crew. It was Cunningham's 100th goal in MLS. Jeff played in 11 games with FC Dallas during the 2008 season scoring 5 goals.

Cunningham scored 17 goals in 2009, including four goals on August 1 against the Kansas City Wizards. After Kenny Cooper left the club for 1860 Munich, Cunningham emerged as the team's go-to goal scorer. He netted seven goals in five games in September, winning MLS Player of the Month and went on to win the 2009 MLS Golden Boot. Cunningham ended the 2010 season as the #2 career regular season MLS goalscorer with 132 goals.

After the 2010 MLS season FC Dallas declined Cunningham's contract option and Cunningham elected to participate in the 2010 MLS Re-Entry Draft. On December 15, 2010 Cunningham was selected by Columbus Crew in Stage 2 of the Re-Entry draft. Prior to Columbus re-signing him on January 28, 2011, Cunningham trained with Norwegian Premier League club IK Start and was rumored to be in talks for a permanent move, however no trade came to pass. His return to Columbus Crew was on February 22, 2011 in the second half of the Crew's CONCACAF Champions League quarter final game against Real Salt Lake. On July 7, 2011, Cunningham scored his 133rd career MLS goal to tie the league's all-time scoring record. The goal came in the 90th minute on a header to win a game against the Vancouver Whitecaps FC by a score of 1–0. He scored his 134th goal—a penalty kick in a 6–2 loss to Seattle Sounders FC—to claim the record outright on August 27.

At season's end, Columbus declined his 2012 contract option and he entered the 2011 MLS Re-Entry Draft. Cunningham was not selected in the draft and became a free agent. In January 2012, Cunningham signed on with first division side and current runner up CSD Comunicaciones of Guatemala for the 2012 Torneo Clausura.

After his release by Comunicaciones, Cunningham signed with NASL club San Antonio Scorpions FC on July 23, 2012.

As of November 29, 2013, Cunningham is on trial with Vicem Hai Phong F.C. of Vietnam's V.League 1.

International
In 1999, he played for Jamaica in a friendly international against Ghana.

Cunningham became a U.S. citizen in November 2001, and received his first cap for the United States national team less than a month later, on December 9, in a friendly against South Korea. He made his first start in a World Cup qualifier on September 7, 2005, against Guatemala.
After a four-year absence from the national team, Cunningham was called up by Bob Bradley for friendlies against Slovakia and Denmark in November 2009. In a friendly against Denmark on November 18, 2009, he scored his first career international goal.

Personal life
Jeff and his wife, Jocelyn have two children, Mikayla, born in 2008 and Eli born in 2014.

Cunningham became a naturalized U.S. citizen on November 13, 2001.

Career statistics

Club

International

International goals

Honors

Club
Columbus Crew
 Lamar Hunt U.S. Open Cup: 2002
 MLS Supporters' Shield: 2004

FC Dallas
 Major League Soccer Western Conference Championship: 2010

Individual
 MLS Golden Boot Winner: 2006, 2009
 MLS Best XI: 2002, 2006, 2009

References

External links
 
 
 

1976 births
Living people
2002 CONCACAF Gold Cup players
2003 FIFA Confederations Cup players
CONCACAF Gold Cup-winning players
American expatriate sportspeople in Canada
American expatriate sportspeople in Guatemala
American expatriate soccer players
American soccer players
Major League Soccer All-Stars
Columbus Crew players
Colorado Rapids players
Real Salt Lake players
Toronto FC players
FC Dallas players
Comunicaciones F.C. players
San Antonio Scorpions players
Dual internationalists (football)
Expatriate soccer players in Canada
Expatriate footballers in Guatemala
Association football forwards
Jamaica international footballers
Jamaican emigrants to the United States
Jamaican footballers
People from Crystal River, Florida
People from Montego Bay
Soccer players from Florida
South Florida Bulls men's soccer players
United States men's international soccer players
University of South Florida alumni
Major League Soccer players
North American Soccer League players
Columbus Crew draft picks